Chief Ẹfúnṣetán Aníwúrà (c. 1820s – June 30, 1874) was the second Iyalode of Ibadan and one of the pre-eminent slave traders in the 19th century Ibadan. Revered as a successful merchant and trader, her impact encompassed the political, military, economic and religious spheres of Ibadan. She was famous for being arguably the most powerful, and certainly, one of the wealthiest - Yoruba women that ever lived. She has been described by historians as an  authoritarian leader, who often utilized capital punishment on erring slaves. This has been attributed to  psychological breakdown resultimg from the death of her only daughter, and her inability to procreate afterwards.

Personal life 
Born in Ikija-Egba in the 1820s, Aniwura's family moved to Ibadan after the fall of Ikija in the 1820s. Her father, Chief Ogunrin, was a warlord from Ikija, while her mother was from Ile-Ife. Her entrepreneurial drive was reported as an inheritance from her mother, who was a petty trader. Aniwura's regular visit to the market alongside her other further enhanced her achievement as a trader. She was married multiple times, and had a child, whom she lost at birth. This event has been the subject of numerous historical writings, and has been attributed to influencing the latter parts of her life, both positively (in terms of focus) and negatively (in terms of ruthlessness).

Rise and fall 
According to Olawale Idowu, Aniwura's decision to migrate to Ibadan was mainly for two reasons: firstly, at the time, her cousin was a prominent leader in the city. Secondly, due to the enterprising nature of the town (Ibadan) at the time, in comparison to other locations, she could start a successful business there. She was reported to have had about two thousand slaves and multiple farms, exporting agricultural produce to Porto-Novo, Badagry and Ikorodu. Her major lines of trade were tobacco and slave trading. She also manufactured a local cosmetic product, Kijipa, that was transported to America for use. Her difficulty in child-bearing was the basis for her diligence in business, even though the adverse effect was her  emotional instability, as having a successor was a major determinant of affluence at that time. She was often depressed and it became evident in her style of leadership. She maintained  that no slave in her household should get pregnant, or get anyone pregnant, and instituted death as the penalty for defaulters. Isola (2010) revealed that during her lifetime, she had ordered the decapitation of 41 of her slaves for flouting her rules.

By the 1860s, she was made the second Iyalode of Ibadan. She was also made a patron of the Anglican Church in Ibadan for her involvement in strengthening Christianity in the community.

She was deposed as Iyalode by Aare Latoosa on May 1, 1874, for politically motivated allegations, despite paying all the fines levied against her.

Her authority within the community and opposition to the political views of the Ibadan de facto ruler, the Aare Ona Kakanfo (war-lord) Latoosa, led him to plot to execute her. This proved to be difficult due to her political position among the high chiefs. He paid-off Kumuyilo, her adopted son, to betray her and lead her to the place of execution. There are many theories on why Latoosa wanted Aniwura out of Ibadan. While some felt it was motivated by sexism and jealousy, other historians believe that it was simply because the city became too dependent on her, especially for military equipment, which was gotten on credit. Some writers argue that her failure to abide by the regulations of the Aare was what led him to get angry with her.

Death 
Aniwura was killed in her sleep by two of her slaves in 1874. They had been instructed to do so by her adopted son, Kumuyilo. Kumuyilo was in turn, bribed by Aare Latoosa, the ruler of Ibadan at the time. The motivation was posited to be that Latoosa felt threatened by her wealth and disobedience towards him.

Legacy 
Chief Aniwura got mainstream attention after being the subject of a play by Professor Akinwunmi Isola.

Aniwura's statue is placed at the center of Challenge roundabout, a major point within the modern city of Ibadan.

She has also been the subject of some Nigerian film productions.

Iyalodes of Ibadan 
 Iyalode Subuola, c.1851-1869
 Iyalode Efunsetan Aniwura, c.1870-1874
 Iyalode Iyaola, 1874-1893
 Iyalode Lanlatu Asabi Giwa, 1894-1913
 Iyalode Isale Osun, 1914-1917
 Iyalode Romlatu Ajisomo, 1917-1934
 Iyalode Rukayat Amosa Akande (alias Iyalode Ita Areegbeomo, 1935-1948
 Iyalode Abimbola, 1948-1961
 Iyalode Adebisi Abeo, 1961-1974
 Iyalode Wuraola Esan, 1975-1985
 Iyalode Hunmani Alade, 1985-1995
 Iyalode Wuraola Akintola, 1995-2007
 Iyalode Aminatu Abiodun, 2007-2018
 Iyalode Theresa Oyekanmi, 2019 - date

References 

1874 deaths
1820s births
Yoruba women in business
Yoruba royalty
History of women in Nigeria
African slave owners
People from colonial Nigeria
African slave traders
Yoruba women in politics
History of Ibadan
18th-century Nigerian people
19th-century Nigerian businesspeople
People from Abeokuta
Businesspeople from Ibadan
19th-century Nigerian businesswomen
People murdered in Ibadan
Female murder victims
Nigerian landowners
Nigerian commodities traders
Nigerian Anglicans
1874 murders in Africa
19th-century murders in Nigeria
Women slave owners